Sir George Barnes Peacock (1805 – 3 December 1890) was an English judge who served as the first Chief Justice of the Calcutta High Court in India and the final Chief Justice of the Supreme Court of Judicature at Fort William.

Peacock was the son of Lewis Peacock, a solicitor. After practising as a special pleader, he was called to the bar in 1836 by the Inner Temple, and joined the Home Circuit. In 1844, he obtained great reputation by pointing out the flaw which invalidated the conviction of Daniel O'Connell and his fellow defendants. He took silk in 1850, and was elected a bencher of the Inner Temple the same year.

In 1852, Peacock went to India as a legal member of the Governor General's Council. The Legislative Council was established soon after his arrival, and although no orator, he was so frequent a speaker that legislation enjoining councillors to deliver their speeches sitting was said to have been devised with the sole object of restraining him. As a member of Lord Dalhousie's council, he supported the annexation of Oudh, and he stood by Lord Canning all through the Indian Mutiny.

In 1859, Peacock became the last Chief Justice of the Supreme Court of Judicature at Fort William, and was knighted. He was appointed the first Chief Justice of the Calcutta High Court on 1 July 1862. He returned to England in 1870 and in 1872 was appointed a paid member of the Judicial Committee of the Privy Council, the court of last resort for the British Empire.

Notes

References

External links
 Brief History of the Calcutta High Court

1810 births
1890 deaths
Members of the Judicial Committee of the Privy Council
Chief Justices of the Calcutta High Court
British India judges
Knights Bachelor
English King's Counsel
Members of the Inner Temple
Members of the Privy Council of the United Kingdom
19th-century English judges